Moz may refer to:

Places
Moz, Kalbajar, a village in the Kalbajar District of Azerbaijan
Porto de Moz, municipality in the state of Pará in the Northern region of Brazil

People
Maurice (given name), as a nickname 
Morris (given name), as a nickname

Marketing
Moz the Monster, 2017's John Lewis Christmas advert

Entertainment
Moz & Cat, 2009 Malayalam psychological comedy drama film
 Moz, a musical project of American musician/composer James Brand

Abbreviations and acronyms
 Mozambique, country code MOZ
 Moorea Airport in Moorea, French Polynesia, IATA code MOZ
 p-Methoxybenzyl carbonyl
 Märkische Oderzeitung, known as MOZ, a German daily newspaper from Frankfurt an der Oder in Brandenburg